Ōhata, Ohata or Oohata (written:  or ) is a Japanese surname. Notable people with the surname include:

, Japanese politician
Allan M. Ohata (1918–1977), United States Army soldier and Medal of Honor recipient
, Japanese rugby union player
, Japanese anime mecha designer, storyboard artist and director
Mariana Ohata (born 1978), Brazilian triathlete
, Japanese sport shooter
, Japanese professional wrestler
, Japanese handball player
, Japanese footballer

Japanese-language surnames